Tiger tank  may refer to:

Tiger I, or Panzerkampfwagen Tiger Ausf. E, a German heavy tank produced from 1942 to 1944
Tiger II, or Panzerkampfwagen Tiger Ausf. B, a German heavy tank produced from 1943 to 1945, also known as Königstiger (King Tiger)
VK 4501 (P), or Tiger (P), a prototype of the Tiger I heavy tank designed by Porsche